Simon Thomas Charlton (born 25 October 1971) is an English football coach, former footballer and radio summariser.

As a player, he was a full back who notably played in the Premier League for Southampton, Bolton Wanderers and Norwich City. He also played in the Football League for Huddersfield Town, Birmingham City and Oldham Athletic. Over his career he made more than 500 league appearances combined. Although primarily a left back he could also play as a left-sided central defender or occasionally in midfield. During 2012 he earned an international cap for Sealand national football team, a micronation who are not recognised by Fifa.

Following retirement he returned to Norwich City as a youth team coach before managing Eastern Counties League club Mildenhall Town. He has since appeared as a co-commentator and summariser on Bolton Wanderers games for BBC Radio Manchester.

Club career
Charlton was born in Huddersfield and began his career at his home-town club Huddersfield Town where he played over a hundred games for the Terriers before moving to Premiership club Southampton for £250,000 in 1993.

From Southampton he was initially loaned to Birmingham City, before making his move permanent in 1998. In May 2000, Charlton was released by Birmingham before signing for Bolton Wanderers, where he was chosen Player of the Year for the 2001–02 season, and subsequently moved to Norwich City in July 2004.

At the end of the 2005–06 season, Charlton was released by Norwich City. He left the club under something of a cloud, stating his belief that manager Nigel Worthington had made a scapegoat and an easy target out of him.

He signed a one-year deal with Oldham Athletic in August 2006. On his first appearance he conceded a penalty, which was saved, and provided the cross for the only goal of the game. He scored once for Oldham, scoring a goal from his own half in a 4–1 win over Gillingham. After his contract at Oldham expired in May 2007, he retired as a player and returned to Norwich City as a youth coach.

International career
In May 2012, Charlton appeared for and captained the Sealand national football team in a match against the Chagos Islands. The match was held at the grounds of Godalming Town.

Coaching and management career
Charlton became manager of Eastern Counties League club Mildenhall Town in April 2009. He made his debut for Mildenhall Town as a substitute in a 0–0 draw with Haverhill Rovers. He left his post in June 2010 due to "unforeseen circumstances and opportunities."

As of September 2011, he works as a Football Coach for the Global Soccer Network, an organisation which looks after the interests of several UK-based African players and many new talents within the game.

Personal life
Charlton is a summariser of Bolton Wanderers games for BBC Radio Manchester.

Honours
Individual
PFA Team of the Year: 1991–92 Third Division, 1992–93 Second Division
Bolton Wanderers Player of the Year: 2001–02

References

External links
 
 
 Stats and photos at Sporting Heroes

1971 births
Living people
Footballers from Huddersfield
Association football defenders
English footballers
Huddersfield Town A.F.C. players
Southampton F.C. players
Birmingham City F.C. players
Bolton Wanderers F.C. players
Norwich City F.C. players
Oldham Athletic A.F.C. players
Mildenhall Town F.C. players
English Football League players
Premier League players
English football managers
Mildenhall Town F.C. managers